HD 153261 is the Henry Draper Catalogue designation for a star in the southern constellation of Ara. It has an apparent visual magnitude of 6.137, placing it near the threshold of naked eye visibility. According to the Bortle Dark-Sky Scale, it can be viewed from dark suburban or rural skies.

This star has been catalogued with a stellar classification of B1 V:ne or B2 IVne, indicating that it is either a main sequence or a subgiant star. The 'n' indicates a nebulous spectrum created by the Doppler shift-broadened absorption lines from a rapid rotation, while the 'e' means this is a Be star, with the spectrum showing emission lines from hot, circumstellar gas. HD 153261 displays some variability with an amplitude of 0.090 in magnitude, and is a suspected spectroscopic binary.

HD 153261 is a large star with over ten times the Sun's mass and around 4.5 the radius of the Sun. It shines with more than 11,000 times the brightness of the Sun, with this energy being radiated into space at an effective temperature of 21,150 K. At this heat, it glows with the blue-white hue of a B-type star.

References

External links
 HR 6304
 HIP 83323
 Image HD 153261

Ara (constellation)
Be stars
153261
083323
6304
Arae, V828
B-type main-sequence stars
Durchmusterung objects